Callimetopus nigritarsis is a species of beetle in the family Cerambycidae. It was described by Francis Polkinghorne Pascoe in 1865. It is known from Moluccas.

References

Callimetopus
Beetles described in 1865